Stiphidion is a genus of South Pacific sheetweb spiders that was first described by Eugène Louis Simon in 1902. Originally placed with the Psechridae, it was moved to the Stiphidiinae in 1967. It is considered a senior synonym of Amarara.

Species
 it contains four species, found in New Zealand and Australia:
Stiphidion adornatum Davies, 1988 – Australia (Queensland)
Stiphidion diminutum Davies, 1988 – Australia (Queensland)
Stiphidion facetum Simon, 1902 (type) – Eastern Australia, Tasmania, New Zealand
Stiphidion raveni Davies, 1988 – Australia (New South Wales)

Stiphidion fera is a synonym of S. facetum.

See also
 List of Stiphidiidae species

References

Araneomorphae genera
Spiders of Oceania
Stiphidiidae